Trittame is a genus of Australian brushed trapdoor spiders first described by L. Koch in 1874.

Species
 it contains twelve species:
Trittame augusteyni Raven, 1994 – Australia (Queensland)
Trittame bancrofti (Rainbow & Pulleine, 1918) – Australia (Queensland)
Trittame berniesmythi Raven, 1994 – Australia (Queensland)
Trittame forsteri Raven, 1990 – Australia (Queensland)
Trittame gracilis L. Koch, 1874 (type) – Australia (Queensland)
Trittame ingrami Raven, 1990 – Australia (Queensland)
Trittame kochi Raven, 1990 – Australia (Queensland)
Trittame loki Raven, 1990 – Australia (Queensland)
Trittame mccolli Raven, 1994 – Australia (Queensland)
Trittame rainbowi Raven, 1994 – Australia (Queensland)
Trittame stonieri Raven, 1994 – Australia (Queensland)
Trittame xerophila Raven, 1990 – Australia (Queensland)

References

Barychelidae
Mygalomorphae genera
Spiders of Australia